Leucospis gigas is a species of parasitoid wasp in the family Leucospidae.

References

Chalcidoidea